I'll Remember April is a 1999 American family drama film starring Pat Morita, Pam Dawber, Haley Joel Osment, Mark Harmon and Yuki Tokuhiro.  It was directed by Bob Clark.

Plot

Four children capture a Japanese soldier who washes ashore during the Second World War.

Although the horrors of World War II are far removed from the Pacific Coast community where adolescent Duke Cooper (Trevor Morgan) and his three best chums play soldier, experiment with swearing, and earnestly patrol the beach for Japanese submarines, the realities of the war are about to come crashing down around them. Not when a Japanese soldier, stranded and wounded when his sub quickly dived, washes ashore; his capture by the foursome merely allows for more playtime and thoughts of becoming heroes. It's coming because Duke's older brother is on some island awaiting combat and the black sedans with military tags have already begun rolling through town to deliver their grim announcements. And Duke's Japanese American pal Willie Tanaka (Yuki Tokuhiro), all three feet and 55 pounds of him, has suddenly become a threat to national security, so he, his mother, and grandfather are soon to be shipped away to an internment camp.

Trivia
The movie was named after the Jazz Standard of the same name, originally written by Gene de Paul, Patricia Johnston and Don Raye.
According to an interview on The Tonight Show, Michael Cera also tried out for the part of Peewee

References

External links

1999 films
1999 drama films
1999 independent films
1990s war films
American adventure drama films
American children's drama films
American children's films
American independent films
Anti-war films about World War II
1990s English-language films
Films about children
Films about families
Films about friendship
Films about race and ethnicity
Films about racism
Films directed by Bob Clark
Films scored by Paul Zaza
Films set in 1942
Films set in California
Films set on the home front during World War II
American World War II films
1990s American films